Sibayo District is one of twenty districts of the province Caylloma in Peru. It is adjacent to Callalli and crossed by the Colca River on one side.

Ethnic groups 
The people in the district are mainly indigenous citizens of Quechua descent. Quechua is the language which the majority of the population (55.45%) learnt to speak in childhood, 44.41% of the residents started speaking using the Spanish language (2007 Peru Census).

See also 
Callalli District
Colca Canyon
Hatun Chunkara
 Paraxra

References

Districts of the Caylloma Province
Districts of the Arequipa Region